Dumaguete is the capital of the province of Negros Oriental, Philippines, and has been dubbed as a "university town" or a "center of learning in the south" by the local and regional media due to the presence of four universities and a host of other colleges and schools in the city. This article lists those schools, colleges and universities.

Universities

Colleges

Technical-Vocational Institutes

Private elementary & high schools

Public elementary schools 

The DepEd-Dumaguete Schools Division has 3 districts namely: North District, South District and West District. DepEd Division office is located inside the campus of Taclobo National High School.

Public high schools

References 

 
Lists of schools in the Philippines